Areeiro may refer to:

Areeiro (Lisbon), a civil parish of Lisbon, Portugal
Praça do Areeiro, former name of Praça Francisco Sá Carneiro, a square in Lisbon, Portugal
Roma-Areeiro railway station, in Lisbon, Portugal
Areeiro (Lisbon Metro) - a station of the Lisbon Metro
Areeiro, Caparica, a neighbourhood of the parish of Caparica, Almada, Portugal